Dancing disco is a studio album by French singer France Gall, released in April 1977. It was conceived as a concept album.

Track listing
All tracks composed by Michel Berger

Certifications

References

France Gall albums
Concept albums
Warner Records albums
1977 albums
Albums produced by Michel Berger